Sergio Zyman (born July 30, 1945) is a marketing executive from Mexico best known as the marketer behind the failed launch of New Coke.

Early life and education
Zyman was born to a Mexican Jewish family in Mexico City. He attended executive programs at Harvard University and graduate schools in London, Paris and Jerusalem though his professional resume does not list a graduate degree or MBA.

Career
Zyman's work experience includes tenures with Coca-Cola, PepsiCo, and Procter & Gamble, and his own firm Zyman Group. He is also known for helping introduce Diet Coke in 1982 and conceiving Fruitopia in 1994. 

After leaving the Coca-Cola Company, Zyman launched a consulting firm called the Zyman Group, which he sold to MDC Partners Inc., a Canadian advertising firm holding company, for around $60 million in April 2005. He was replaced there as Chairman by Scott Miller, formerly with McCann Erickson. The Zyman Group is no longer in business. Zyman later served as a director of Upstream Worldwide, the parent company of uSell.com, but he has been replaced there and is no longer on the Executive Team. He then worked with JC Penney as a Marketing Consultant but was promptly fired after the failed re-positioning of the chain.

New Coke
A cover story in Fortune Magazine from May 1, 1995 referred to New Coke as the biggest marketing blunder since the launch of Ford's Edsel.  New Coke was a reformulation of the original Coca-Cola flavor. After significant consumer opposition, the original flavor was reintroduced after  77 days. Fortune Magazine reported:
Zyman, then head of U.S. marketing, was coming off his enormously successful introduction of diet Coke when he was assigned day-to-day responsibility for top-secret Project Kansas in 1984. The zealous Mexican insisted that Coca-Cola (or Co-Coola, as he pronounces it) must act boldly to reverse its 20-year market-share decline vs. Pepsi. Zyman, a former Pepsi marketer, argued that the correct strategy was to replace 98-year-old Coke with a better-tasting cola, label it New Coke," and blare the news--which is exactly what the company did. Zyman's greatest error, which some attribute to ego, was that he and his team failed to present the option of keeping old Coke on the market.

Published works
Zyman has written four books  on   marketing and advertising, including:
The End of Advertising as We Know It with Armin Brott. John Wiley & Sons, 2002
The End of Marketing as We Know It

References

1945 births
Living people
Advertising people
Businesspeople from Mexico City
Mexican Jews
Coca-Cola people
PepsiCo people